Invisible Baby  is the first solo studio album by New York keyboardist Marco Benevento.

Musicians 
 Marco Benevento – piano, mellotron, circuit bent toys, keyboards
 Reed Mathis – bass (Tea Leaf Green, Jacob Fred Jazz Odyssey)
 Matt Chamberlain – drums (Tori Amos, Critters Buggin)
 Andrew Barr – drums (The Slip)

Track listing 
 "Bus Ride"
 "Record Book"
 "Atari"
 "The Real Morning Party"
 "You Must Be A Lion"
 "If You Keep Asking Me"
 "Ruby"
 "Are You The Favorite Person Of Anybody?"

References 

liner notes

Marco Benevento albums
2008 albums